This is the discography of the defunct Icelandic record label Gramm.

(*): Skytturnar was the soundtrack to the film directed by Friðrik Þór Friðriksson. It featured The Sugarcubes, Bubbi Morthens, and Megas, among many others. For more information about the movie, please see Skytturnar (film).

Record label discographies